Jordan competed at the 2020 Summer Paralympics in Tokyo, Japan, from 24 August to 5 September 2021.

Medalists

Competitors

Athletics 

One Jordanian male athlete, Ahmad Hindi (Shot Put F34), successfully to break through the qualifications for the 2020 Paralympics after breaking the qualification limit.

Powerlifting

Source:

Table tennis

Jordan entered one athletes into the table tennis competition at the games. Khetam Abuawad qualified via World Ranking allocation.

Women

See also 
Jordan at the Paralympics
Jordan at the 2020 Summer Olympics

References 

Jordan at the Paralympics
Nations at the 2020 Summer Paralympics
2021 in Jordanian sport